Songs for the Season, or Ingrid Michaelson's Songs for the Season, is the seventh studio album by American singer-songwriter Ingrid Michaelson. It was released by Cabin 24 Records on October 26, 2018. It is her first Christmas album and takes a nostalgic approach to covers of Christmas standards and carols. A deluxe edition reissue, featuring five additional tracks, was released on November 5, 2021.

Background
Michaelson expressed that she loves the Christmas holiday and has wished to record a holiday album for years. Having recorded various Christmas songs such as the charity single "Winter Song", a duet with Sara Bareilles, she released Snowfall in 2017, an EP that compiled the winter- and holiday-themed songs she had recorded over the course of her career. Discussions about making her next studio album a full-length Christmas record began the same year. Drawing inspiration from Frank Sinatra, Nat King Cole, Judy Garland, and Brenda Lee, Michaelson envisioned an album "that was an instant, nostalgic classic" and would convey authenticity, warmth, and familiarity. She remarked, "I just wanted to make something that would honor that and celebrate that and something that I would want to listen to year after year after year after year. It wouldn’t go sour, or go bad, or be dated."

Michaelson commissioned her friends, writers and producers Dan Romer and Saul Simon-MacWilliams, to produce the album. A breakaway from the adult contemporary pop sound on her previous album, the trio formulated the sound of Songs for the Season by using a microphone from the 1950s and recording all the strings together instead of double-tracking single recordings. While some of the songs remained close to the original versions, others were arranged more freely; Michaelson stated: "On Christmas covers you want something that is familiar that reminds you of past Christmases and holidays, and so I didn’t really want to reinvent the wheel". Primarily a compilation of cover versions of Christmas standards and carols, Songs for the Season features one original track, "Happy Happy Christmas", which sheds light on the recent deaths of her parents.

Critical reception

Allmusic editor Matt Collar remarked that "rather than take the more common contemporary approach to her first album of holiday-themed music on 2018's Songs for the Season, singer/songwriter Ingrid Michaelson instead successfully wraps herself in an old-school production that sounds like it was recorded in the 1950s." While he felt that the retro aesthetic of the album marked a breakaway from Michaelson's adult contemporary pop sound, Collar favorably compared the "cozy atmosphere" of the album, and its "big-band horns, cinematic strings, and cheery backing vocalists", with "the warmth of a happy childhood home during the holidays." Jon Caramanica from The New York Times declared the album "polite and precise Golden Age Christmas carol revivalism." He felt that while "the ornate first half of this album is pleasant, [...] the looser second half — with a cheeky “What Are You Doing New Year’s Eve,” a spunky duet with Grace VanderWaal on “Rockin’ Around the Christmas Tree” and a surprisingly understated and tactile version of “All I Want for Christmas Is You,” with Leslie Odom Jr. — has real joy." Rolling Stone writer Connor Ratliff complimented Michaelson for the inclusion of her sole original record “Happy, Happy Christmas" and added: "[The album] is now in the rotation with Guaraldi & Sinatra & The Longines Symphonette, competing for time on the turntable all month long."

Track listing

Charts

Release history

References

2018 Christmas albums
Christmas albums by American artists
Ingrid Michaelson albums
Pop Christmas albums